The West Indies cricket team toured South Africa during the 1998–99 season and played a five-match Test series and a seven-match One Day International series against the South Africa national cricket team, as well as nine tour matches. This was the first Test series between the two teams in South Africa.

West Indies was led in the Test series by Brian Lara while South Africa was led by Hansie Cronje.

South Africa won the Test series 5–0 and the ODI series 6–1. The Test series victory was only the seventh 5–0 victory in a five-match series in Test cricket history. 

Jacques Kallis of South Africa emerged as the top run-scorer in the Test series with 485 runs, with an average of 69.28. Shaun Pollock finished the series as top wicket-taker with 29 wickets. Kallis was named "man of the Test series".

Squads 

Jimmy Adams was injured before the start of the Test series and was replaced by Floyd Reifer. Dinanath Ramnarine was injured before the start of the Test series and was replaced by Rawl Lewis. The bowling attack was reinforced during the Test series by the addition of Ottis Gibson and Reon King.

Test matches

1st Test

2nd Test

3rd Test

4th Test

5th Test

ODI series summary

1st ODI

2nd ODI

3rd ODI

4th ODI

5th ODI

6th ODI

7th ODI

References

External links
 Tour home at ESPNcricinfo
 West Indies in South Africa, 1998-1999 at ESPNcricinfo archive
 
 

1998 in South African cricket
1999 in South African cricket
South African cricket seasons from 1970–71 to 1999–2000
1998-99
International cricket competitions from 1997–98 to 2000
1998 in West Indian cricket
1999 in West Indian cricket